Ismael 'Isma' López Blanco (born 29 January 1990) is a Spanish professional footballer. Mainly a left back, he can also play as a left winger.

Club career
Born in Pamplona, Navarre, López signed for Athletic Bilbao in 2005 at the age of 15, going on to spend three full seasons with the reserve side in the Segunda División B. He continued to play in the lower leagues the following years, with Real Zaragoza B (Tercera División) and CD Lugo (third tier), helping the latter to promote to Segunda División after an absence of twenty years in his only season.

López returned to the Lions – who had retained a buyback option on the player – in the summer of 2012, being offered a two-year contract with a €30 million buyout clause. He scored twice on his official debut, helping to a 3–1 home win against NK Slaven Belupo in the UEFA Europa League's third qualifying round, on 8 August 2012 (4–3 aggregate victory).

In July 2013, López cut ties with Athletic and signed a three-year deal with Sporting de Gijón. During the 2014–15 campaign, he was converted into a left back by manager Abelardo Fernández, appearing in 25 matches and scoring five goals as his team returned to La Liga after three years.

López terminated his contract with Sporting on 9 July 2018, and moved abroad for the first time in his career after agreeing to a contract with AC Omonia just hours later. The following 29 January, he returned to Spain and its second division after joining CD Tenerife on a two-and-a-half-year deal.

On 1 September 2020, López was transferred to Romanian Liga I side FC Dinamo București. He left in December, due to unpaid wages.

Career statistics

Club

Honours
Spain U17
UEFA European Under-17 Championship: 2007
FIFA U-17 World Cup runner-up: 2007

References

External links

1990 births
Living people
Spanish footballers
Footballers from Pamplona
Association football defenders
Association football wingers
La Liga players
Segunda División players
Segunda División B players
Tercera División players
Primera Federación players
Bilbao Athletic footballers
Real Zaragoza B players
CD Lugo players
Athletic Bilbao footballers
Sporting de Gijón players
CD Tenerife players
Racing de Santander players
Cypriot First Division players
AC Omonia players
Liga I players
FC Dinamo București players
Spain youth international footballers
Spanish expatriate footballers
Expatriate footballers in Cyprus
Expatriate footballers in Romania
Spanish expatriate sportspeople in Cyprus
Spanish expatriate sportspeople in Romania